Events in the year 1975 in Ireland.

Incumbents
 President: Cearbhall Ó Dálaigh
 Taoiseach: Liam Cosgrave (FG)
 Tánaiste: Brendan Corish (Lab)
 Minister for Finance: Richie Ryan (FG)
 Chief Justice: Tom O'Higgins
 Dáil: 20th
 Seanad: 13th

Events
 January–June – Ireland held Presidency of the Council of the European Union for the first time.
 7 January – Sinéad de Valera, wife of the former president, died in Dublin aged 96.
 30 January – Charles Haughey was brought back onto the Fianna Fáil party front bench.
 14 March – Pierre Trudeau, the prime minister of Canada, paid a brief visit to Ireland and held bilateral talks at Dublin Castle.
 17 April – Mary Immaculate College, Limerick, and Our Lady of Mercy College, Carysfort, became recognised colleges of the National University of Ireland.
 18 June – Danny O'Hare became acting director of the National Institute for Higher Education, Dublin; a day later, the governing body first met.
 31 July – Miami Showband killings: Three members of The Miami Showband and two paramilitaries were killed in an Ulster Volunteer Force ambush in County Down as they returned home to Dublin from playing at a dance in Banbridge, Northern Ireland.
 29 August – Former revolutionary, Taoiseach, and President of Ireland, Éamon de Valera died in Dublin aged 92. The government announced a day of mourning.
 3 October – Dutch industrialist and Limerick factory owner Tiede Herrema was kidnapped.
 12 October – Oliver Plunkett, the 17th-century Archbishop of Armagh, was canonised by Pope Paul VI in Rome.
 21 October – Tiede Herrema was located with his kidnappers in Monasterevin, County Kildare and a police siege began.
 18 November – The Tiede Herrema kidnap siege ended.
 28 December – George Best played a League of Ireland match for Cork Celtic against Drogheda.

Arts and literature
 14 May – Cork-born writer Patrick Galvin's We Do It For Love, a satire on The Troubles, opened at the Lyric Theatre, Belfast.
 7 October – Tom Murphy's play The Sanctuary Lamp opened at the Abbey Theatre, Dublin to religious controversy.
 Leland Bardwell, Pearse Hutchinson, Eiléan Ní Chuilleanáin and Macdara Woods founded the literary publication Cyphers.
 Garry Hynes, Mick Lally, and Marie Mullen founded the Druid Theatre Company in Galway.
 Lillias Mitchell founded the Irish Guild of Weavers, Spinners, and Dyers.
 Publications:
 Eavan Boland's collection of poems The War Horse was published.
 Paul Durcan's collection of poems O Westport in the Light of Asia Minor was published.
 John McGahern's novel The Leavetaking was published.
 John Ryan's memoir Remembering How We Stood was published.

Sport

Golf
 The Carroll's Irish Open golf tournament was won by Irish player Christy O'Connor Jnr.

Births
 1 January – Lorraine Pilkington, actress.
 24 January – Marie McMahon, long-distance runner
 12 February – Andrew Myler, association football player.
 1 March – Tara Blaise, singer.
 17 April – Mark Foley, Limerick hurler.
 19 April – Hugh O'Conor, actor.
 25 April – Dara Ó Cinnéide, Kerry Gaelic footballer.
 10 May – Clodagh McKenna, cookery writer and presenter.
 10 June – Seánie McGrath, Cork hurler.
 6 August – Willie Boland, association football player.
 25 August – Pat Mulcahy, Cork hurler.
 28 August – Gareth Farrelly, association football player.
 15 September – Owen Butler, cricketer.
 2 October – Girvan Dempsey, rugby player.
 7 November – Ollie Moran, Limerick hurler.
 16 December – Graham Lee, National Hunt jockey.
 18 December – David O'Doherty, comedian.
 20 December – Graham Hopkins, drummer.

Full date unknown
 David Kitt, musician.
 Paul Murray, novelist.

Deaths
 7 January – Sinéad de Valera, writer and wife of former president, Éamon de Valera (born 1878).
 23 February – Ernest Blythe, writer, journalist, and theatre manager, member of First Dáil, and Cabinet minister (born 1889).
 27 February – John Vincent Holland, soldier, recipient of the Victoria Cross for gallantry in 1916 at Guillemont, France (born 1889).
 21 April – James Kempster, cricketer (born 1892).
 23 April – Michael Carty, Fianna Fáil party Teachta Dála (TD) (born 1916).
 28 April – Tom Dreaper, horse trainer.
 29 April – Arthur Blair-White, cricketer (born 1891).
 10 May – Michael Tierney, Cumann na nGaedheal party TD, Fine Gael party member of Seanad Éireann (Senate) and President of University College Dublin (born 1894).
 27 May – Robert Collis, physician and writer (born 1900).
 24 June – Frank MacDermot, barrister, soldier, banker, and politician (born 1886).
 31 July – Dan "Sandow" O'Donovan, Irish Republican Army member during the Irish War of Independence (b. c1895).
 9 August – Maurice Gorham, journalist and broadcasting executive (born 1902).
 10 August – Robert Barton, Sinn Féin party Member of Parliament, Cabinet minister, and signatory of Anglo-Irish Treaty 1921 (born 1881).
 29 August – Éamon de Valera, former Taoiseach and President of Ireland (born 1882).
 2 October – Seamus Murphy, sculptor (born 1907).
 25 October – Padraig Marrinan, artist (born 1906).
 26 October – William Teeling, author, traveller and UK politician (born 1903).
 25 November – Moyna Macgill, stage and film actress, mother of Angela Lansbury (born 1895).
 14 December – George Harman, cricketer and rugby player (born 1874).

See also
 1975 in Irish television

References

 
1970s in Ireland
Ireland
Years of the 20th century in Ireland